Wilton is located northeast of Wilton Center, Illinois, northwest of Andres and south of Frankfort.

Wilton is the smallest Unincorporated community in Will County. It is smaller than Andres with a population of approximately 20 people, and at one point was simply a rail depot for the now-removed Illinois, Iowa, and Minnesota line.

References

Unincorporated communities in Will County, Illinois
Unincorporated communities in Illinois